Long Distance Voyager is the tenth album by the Moody Blues, first released in May 1981 on the group's Threshold record label. It was the group's first album featuring keyboardist Patrick Moraz (who previously had worked with bands such as Refugee and Yes) in place of co-founder Mike Pinder, who left after Octave in 1978.

Upon release in 1981, Long Distance Voyager became the Moody Blues' second American number one album, and was also the source of the US Top 20 singles "Gemini Dream" (#12) and "The Voice" (#15).  It also continued their winning streak in their native United Kingdom, reaching #7 there.

In November 2008, the album was remastered and released on CD with one extra track.

Overview
The songs on Long Distance Voyager were recorded at the band's own Threshold Studios. The songs were recorded and mixed by Greg Jackman, while Pip Williams was the album's producer. Supplementing the Moody Blues—Justin Hayward, John Lodge, Ray Thomas, Graeme Edge, and Patrick Moraz—was a string section performed by the New World Philharmonic, which Pip Williams arranged.

Long Distance Voyager is only partially a concept album, as only half of the songs relate to the "voyager" referred to in the album's title. The final three tracks comprise a mini-suite that combines themes of carnival jesters and the chaos experienced backstage at a rock show.

The cover for the album was a painting entitled "Punch" (1840) by Thomas Webster from the Art Union of Glasgow, while the sleeve was based on a concept by the Moody Blues which was designed by Cream, who were in charge of the album's cover artwork. NASA's Voyager spacecraft is at the top of the front side of the album cover.  Both Voyager 1 and Voyager 2's flybys of Saturn were in the news in 1980–81.

Original track listing

Personnel
Justin Hayward – vocals, guitars
John Lodge – vocals, bass guitar
Ray Thomas – vocals, flute, harmonica
Graeme Edge – drums, percussion 
Patrick Moraz – keyboards, synthesizers, arrangements

Additional personnel
B. J. Cole – pedal steel guitar on "In My World"
New World Philharmonic – orchestrations 
Pip Williams – string arrangements and director of the orchestra
Dave Symonds - spoken word

Production 

Pip Williams – producer, string arrangements
Greg Jackman – recording engineer, mixing
Norman Goodman – assistant to Greg Jackman
Melvyn Abrahams – mastering
Ted Jensen – mastering for US release
Cream – sleeve design, artwork

Charts

Year-end charts

Certifications

References

External links
 
 Long Distance Voyager at Yahoo! Music.

The Moody Blues albums
1981 albums
Threshold Records albums
Albums recorded at RAK Studios
Albums produced by Pip Williams